Nuri Saryal (2 September 1929 - 22 December 2020) was a Turkish educator of the Azerbaijani origin. He served as rector of Middle East Technical University from 1977 to 1979.

Early life 
He was born in Baku, Azerbaijan SSR as the son of Ismail and Helena (née Hoffmann) Seyitzade. He became a Turkish citizen in 1931, when the family name changed to Saryal. In 1947 he graduated from Atatürk Gymnasium in Ankara. From 1947–1948 he attended English medium prep school. In 1952 he graduated from Robert College Engineering School B.Sc. Mechanical Engineering. He attended Purdue University, earning a MSc. Mechanical Engineering. In 1956 he graduated from the Technical University of Berlin with a PhD in Mechanical Engineering. His dissertation was "Unsteady State Temperature Distribution in Steam Turbine Rotors Using Electrical Analogy". This led to a patent by AEG Comp., which financed his research.

From 1956–1957 he served as a reserve officer at the General Staff, Technical Research and Development Center.

Career 
From 1958–1962 he served as Chief engineer at a private company, where he was responsible for the construction of electrical and electronic utilities on 5 NATO airbases. In 1962 he became assistant professor in the Mechanical Engineering Department of the Middle East Technical University. From 1963–1965 he chaired the Mechanical Engineering Department. From 1964–1969 he was Assistant to the President METU. In 1966 he became Associate professor. His habilitation subject was "Determination of (Unsteady State) Thermal Stresses Through Electrical Analogy".

From 1970–1972 he was the A.V. Humboldt Fellow and visiting professor at Munich Technical University. His lectures "Elektrische Analogiemethoden für Wärmeübertragungs- und Wärme-spannungsprobleme" were published.

He returned to METU where in 1975 he became a full Professor. From 1977–1979 he served as President (Rector) of the University.

In 1979 he lectured for three months at Stuttgart University. From 1979–1980 he lectured at Munich Tech. Univ. on Electrical Analogy of  Heat Transfer and Mechanical Systems. He then settled in at METU, remaining from 1980-1996 when he became an Emeritus Professor.

In 1992 he published “Das Grosse Verdienstkreuz des Verdienstordens der Bundesrepublik Deutschland.”

Thereafter he continued research on "Electrical Simulation of Compressible Fluid Flow". He developed a drift free, highly stable analog integrator, suitable for analog-digital hybrid computation of scientific phenomena.

Outside activities 

 1962–2004	Turkisch-Deutscher Kulturbeirat (Mitglied des Vorstandes) und President des Vorsandes (Goethe-Institut Ankara) (1998–2003).

 1981–1993	President of the Turkish Soc. Heat & Mass Transfer.
 1982	Gründungs Mitglied des A. von Humboldt-Club's Ankara.

 2000-	President des A. von Humboldt-Club's Ankara.

References

http://www.metu.edu.tr/~saryal/cv.html

1929 births
2020 deaths
Turkish electrical engineers
Robert College alumni
Krannert School of Management alumni
Technical University of Berlin alumni
Academic staff of the University of Stuttgart
Academic staff of the Technical University of Munich
Rectors of Middle East Technical University
Commanders Crosses of the Order of Merit of the Federal Republic of Germany
Turkish people of Azerbaijani descent